Mynomes is a North American subgenus of voles in the genus Microtus. Species in this subgenus are:
Gray-tailed vole, M. canicaudus
Western meadow vole M. drummondii
Florida salt marsh vole M. dukecampbelli
Montane vole, M.  montanus
Creeping vole, M. oregoni
Eastern meadow vole, M. pennsylvanicus
Townsend's vole, M. townsendii

References
D.E. Wilson & D.M. Reeder, 2005: Mammal Species of the World: A Taxonomic and Geographic Reference. Third Edition. The Johns Hopkins University Press, Baltimore.

Voles and lemmings
Taxa named by Constantine Samuel Rafinesque
Animal subgenera